Fairlawn High School is a public high school east of Sidney, Ohio.  It is the only high school in the Fairlawn Local Schools district.  Their teams are called the Fairlawn Jets (their logo is also a jet). Their mascot is an unnamed aviator.

Fairlawn wears blue and white and competes in the Shelby County Athletic League. It is the local public school for the Tawawa, Plattsville, Pemberton, and Pasco communities. Primarily a small school with an average graduating class size of approximately 40 - 50 students, it offers students the ability to participate in many extra curricular activities (such as varsity sports, band, musicals, etc), but does not have the amenities and/or advanced college preparation classes seen at other schools in the area.

External links
 District Website

Notes and references

High schools in Shelby County, Ohio
Public high schools in Ohio